Mount Mentzel is a peak,  high, standing  east of Mount Zimmermann in the Gruber Mountains of Queen Maud Land, Antarctica. it was discovered by the Third German Antarctic Expedition under Alfred Ritscher, 1938–39, and named for Rudolf Mentzel, the president of the Deutsche Forschungsgemeinschaft (German Research Society).

References

Mountains of Queen Maud Land
Princess Astrid Coast